North 1 West is a rugby union league at the sixth level within the English league system. The league is made up of teams from north west England and the Isle of Man; principally consisting of the English counties of Cheshire, Cumbria, Greater Manchester, Lancashire and Merseyside.  The league was known as North Division 2 when it was first created back in 1987 and was a single division.  It has since split into two regional leagues, with North West 1 and its compatriot North 1 East being the longest running versions of the division.

Promotion and relegation determine the makeup of the league each season, with the top team automatically moving into North Premier and the second-placed team entering into a play-off match with the second-placed team in North 1 East. Occasionally, depending on promotion and relegation, teams from either North 1 East and North 1 West may be required to compete in the opposite league to ensure that the number of teams in the east and west leagues remains at 14 teams each.  Teams dropping from the league go into North 2 West.

Teams 2021–22

The teams competing in 2021-22 achieved their places in the league based on performances in 2019-20, the 'previous season' column in the table below refers to that season not 2020-21.

2020–21

On 30 October 2020 the RFU announced  that due to the coronavirus pandemic a decision had been taken to cancel Adult Competitive Leagues (National League 1 and below) for the 2020/21 season meaning North 1 West was not contested.

Teams 2019–20

Original teams
When league rugby began in 1987 this was a single division containing the following teams from the north of England:

Alnwick
Aspatria
Bradford & Bingley
Davenport   
Halifax
Huddersfield
Lymm
Manchester
New Brighton
Sandal
Wilmslow

North 1 West honours

North Division 2 (1987–1993)

The original North Division 2 was a tier 6 league with promotion up to North Division 1 and relegation down to either North East 1 or North West 1.

North Division 2 (1993–1996)

The creation of National 5 North for the 1993–94 season, meant that North Division 2 dropped from being a tier 6 league to a tier 7 league for the years that National 5 North was active.

North Division 2 (1996–2000)

The cancellation of National 5 North at the end of the 1995–96 season meant that North Division 2 reverted to being a tier 6 league.

North 2 West

For the 2000–01 season, North Division 2 was split into two regional divisions - North 2 East and North 2 West.  While promotion continued up into North Division 1, the cancellation of the North West 1, North West 2 and North West 3 meant that relegation was to either North Lancashire/Cumbria or South Lancs/Cheshire 1.

North 1 West

For the 2009–10 season the division would be renamed North 1 West as part of wholesale national restructure of the league system by the RFU leading to mass changes at all levels including in the north.

Promotion play-offs
Since the 2000–01 season there has been a play-off between the runners-up of North 1 East and North 1 West for the third and final promotion place to North Premier. The team with the superior league record has home advantage in the tie.  At the end of the 2019–20 season the North 1 East have been the most successful with thirteen wins to the North 1 West teams six; and the home team has won promotion on fifteen occasions compared to the away teams five.

Number of league titles

Altrincham Kersal (2)
Birkenhead Park (2)
Vale of Lune (2)
Aspatria (1)
Bradford & Bingley (1)
Burnage (1)
Caldy (1)
Carlisle (1)
Chester (1)
Darlington Mowden Park
Doncaster (1)
Kendal (1)
Kirkby Lonsdale (1)
Liverpool St Helens (1)
Lymm (1)
Macclesfield (1)
Manchester (1)
New Brighton (1)
Northern (1)
Rochdale (1)
Rotherham (1) 
Sandbach (1)
Sale FC (1)
Stockport (1)
Stockton (1) 
West Park St Helens (1)
Wharfedale (1)
Wirral (1)
York (1)

See also
 Cheshire RFU
 Cumbria RU
 Lancashire RFU
 English rugby union system
 Rugby union in England

Notes

References

6
Sports leagues established in 1987
Recurring sporting events established in 1987
Rugby union in Cheshire
Rugby union in Cumbria
Rugby union in Greater Manchester
Rugby union in Lancashire
Sport in the Metropolitan Borough of Wirral